The 2019 Nigerian Senate election in Rivers State was held on February 23, 2019, to elect members of the Nigerian Senate to represent Rivers State. Betty Apiafi representing Rivers West, Barry Mpigi representing Rivers South East and George Thompson Sekibo representing Rivers East all won on the platform of Peoples Democratic Party.

Overview

Summary

Results

Rivers West 
A total of 18 candidates registered with the Independent National Electoral Commission to contest in the election. PDP candidate Betty Apiafi won the election, defeating SDP Obaghama Dighobo and 16 other party candidates.

Rivers South East 
A total of 22 candidates registered with the Independent National Electoral Commission to contest in the election. PDP candidate Barry Mpigi won the election, defeating A Badey Suage Alexander and 20 other party candidates.

Rivers East 
A total of 19 candidates registered with the Independent National Electoral Commission to contest in the election. PDP candidate George Thompson Sekibo won the election, defeating A Nwuke Azubuike and 17 other party candidates.

References 

Rivers State senatorial elections
2019 Rivers State elections
Rivers State Senate elections
February 2019 events in Nigeria